Aline Reich Rincón (born 6 September 1974) is a Mexican former synchronized swimmer who competed in the 1996 Summer Olympics. She is the sister of Ingrid Reich.

References

1974 births
Living people
Mexican synchronized swimmers
Olympic synchronized swimmers of Mexico
Synchronized swimmers at the 1996 Summer Olympics